Furconthophagus is a genus of Scarabaeidae or scarab beetles in the superfamily Scarabaeoidea, more usually treated as a subgenus of Onthophagus

References

Scarabaeidae